"Hot Shower" is a song by American rapper Chance the Rapper, featuring vocals from fellow American rappers MadeinTYO and DaBaby. It serves as the second single from Chance's debut studio album The Big Day. It was produced by Smoko Ono, who wrote the song with the three artists.

Music video 
The music video was released alongside the single on October 28, 2019. It was directed by Reel Goats, who have directed many of DaBaby's music videos. The visual plays out a reference to the film Good Burger in the song. Jake Johnson and Kel Mitchell make cameos in the video.

Charts

References 

2019 singles
2019 songs
Chance the Rapper songs
DaBaby songs
Songs written by Chance the Rapper
Songs written by DaBaby
Trap music songs